Gilia leptantha is a species of flowering plant in the phlox family known by the common name fineflower gilia.

It is native to California and southern Nevada, where it grows in open mountain and desert habitat.

Description
Gilia leptantha is a small, mostly erect herb with a glandular stem often coated in cobwebby fibers. The leaves are arranged in a rounded basal rosette, each leaf divided sharply into many subdivided lobes.

The top of the stem is an inflorescence of a few pink to lavender flowers with yellow and white throats. The base of the flower is a thin, glandular tube.

External links
Jepson Manual Treatment: Gilia leptantha
Gilia leptantha — U.C. Photo gallery

leptantha
Flora of California
Flora of Nevada
Flora of the California desert regions
Flora of the Sierra Nevada (United States)
Natural history of the California chaparral and woodlands
Natural history of the Mojave Desert
Natural history of the Santa Monica Mountains
Natural history of the Transverse Ranges
Plants described in 1900
Taxa named by Samuel Bonsall Parish
Flora without expected TNC conservation status